Elachista orstadii is a moth of the family Elachistidae found in Europe.

Description
Adults have been recorded in June.

Distribution
It is found in Sweden, Great Britain, Denmark, the Netherlands, Germany, the Czech Republic, Slovakia, Austria, Switzerland and Italy.

References

orstadii
Leaf miners
Moths described in 1943
Moths of Europe